Harold Peter "Hassa" Mann (born 09 October 1940) is a former Australian rules footballer who played for and captained Melbourne in the VFL during the 1960s. He earned the name Hassa when he was a toddler, from his cousin and future Melbourne footballer Len Mann.

A centreman, Mann was recruited from Rutherglen, Victoria and made his debut for Melbourne in their premiership season of 1959. He was a premiership player again the following season and went on to become the club captain in 1965, a position he kept for four seasons.

Mann finished in the top 10 of the Brownlow Medal count four times, including placing equal 7th in 1966 and equal 5th in 1967. He won Melbourne's Best and Fairest back to back in 1962 and 1963, and for a third time in 1967. He also twice topped their goalkicking, doing so as captain in 1967 and 1968. For his performance for Victoria in the 1966 Hobart Carnival he earned All-Australian selection.

After finishing his VFL career in Victoria he became captain-coach at South Fremantle, in Western Australia in the WAFL, winning a best and fairest in his debut season and captain-coaching that club to a Premiership in his second year, 1970.

Mann coached Caulfield in the Victorian Football Association in 1981, and he was coach of the 1982 Eltham premiership team.

In 2000 he was named at the half forward flank in Melbourne's official 'Team of the Century'. He was inducted into the Australian Football Hall of Fame in 2013.

Playing statistics

|- style="background-color: #EAEAEA"
! scope="row" style="text-align:center" | 1959
|style="text-align:center;"|
| 29 || 17 || 21 ||  ||  ||  ||  ||  ||  || 1.2 ||  ||  ||  ||  ||  || 
|-
! scope="row" style="text-align:center" | 1960
|style="text-align:center;"|
| 29 || 20 || 22 ||  ||  ||  ||  ||  ||  || 1.1 ||  ||  ||  ||  ||  || 
|- style="background:#eaeaea;"
! scope="row" style="text-align:center" | 1961
|style="text-align:center;"|
| 29 || 20 || 26 ||  ||  ||  ||  ||  ||  || 1.3 ||  ||  ||  ||  ||  || 
|-
! scope="row" style="text-align:center" | 1962
|style="text-align:center;"|
| 29 || 20 || 8 ||  ||  ||  ||  ||  ||  || 0.4 ||  ||  ||  ||  ||  || 
|- style="background:#eaeaea;"
! scope="row" style="text-align:center" | 1963
|style="text-align:center;"|
| 29 || 20 || 6 ||  ||  ||  ||  ||  ||  || 0.3 ||  ||  ||  ||  ||  || 
|-
! scope="row" style="text-align:center" | 1964
|style="text-align:center;"|
| 29 || 19 || 15 ||  ||  ||  ||  ||  ||  || 0.8 ||  ||  ||  ||  ||  || 
|- style="background:#eaeaea;"
! scope="row" style="text-align:center" | 1965
|style="text-align:center;"|
| 29 || 14 || 9 || 8 || 241 || 46 || 287 || 61 ||  || 0.6 || 0.6 || 17.2 || 3.3 || 20.5 || 4.4 || 
|-
! scope="row" style="text-align:center" | 1966
|style="text-align:center;"|
| 29 || 14 || 19 || 15 || 294 || 242 || 52 || 69 ||  || 1.4 || 1.1 || 17.3 || 3.7 || 21.0 || 4.9 || 
|- style="background:#eaeaea;"
! scope="row" style="text-align:center" | 1967
|style="text-align:center;"|
| 29 || 17 || 38 || 20 || 325 || 66 || 391 || 79 ||  || 2.2 || 1.2 || 19.1 || 3.9 || 23.0 || 4.6 || 
|-
! scope="row" style="text-align:center" | 1968
|style="text-align:center;"|
| 29 || 18 || 29 || 21 || 345 || 71 || 416 || 95 ||  || 1.6 || 1.2 || 19.2 || 3.9 || 23.1 || 5.3 || 
|- class="sortbottom"
! colspan=3| Career
! 178
! 193
! 64
! 1153
! 235
! 1388
! 304
! 
! 1.1
! 1.0
! 18.3
! 3.7
! 22.0
! 4.8
! 
|}

References

External links

DemonWiki profile

1940 births
Australian rules footballers from Victoria (Australia)
Melbourne Football Club players
South Fremantle Football Club players
South Fremantle Football Club coaches
Keith 'Bluey' Truscott Trophy winners
All-Australians (1953–1988)
Melbourne Football Club captains
Melbourne Football Club CEOs
Rutherglen Football Club players
Australian Football Hall of Fame inductees
Eltham Football Club coaches
Living people
Melbourne Football Club Premiership players
Three-time VFL/AFL Premiership players
Caulfield Football Club coaches